Rolfo S.p.A. is an Italian manufacturer of truck superstructures. The company is a leader in Europe. The company is specialized for truck trailers Products are used by truck manufacturers such as Iveco, Mercedes-Benz, Volvo and Scania. As of 2012 the company was led by the fourth generation of Rolfo's family.

Today the Italian company has a museum recapitulating its 120 years of existence.

History
The company was created in 1885 by Italian Giorgo Rolfo in the north part of Italy. It started in a medium-sized workshop. Later the company start to build wagons and carriages. In the 1950s Rolfo made wagons for special vehicles. Special wagons were constructed for Fiat, Alfa Romeo and Lancia trucks.

Museum
The museum displays early machines and carriages built by the family, including a flanging machine, drills, a farm cart and more special vehicles.

Products

Truck carriers
 Gemini
 Centaurus
 Hercules

Short long
 Dynamic
 Ego
 Active
 Free
 U.K.
 Pegasus H
 Pegasus L
 Sirio L
 Sirio H

References

 Gamba, Danilo (2002). "Rolfo. On the roads of the world for more than one century", L'Artistica Savigliano S.r.l., 50-55(89)

External links
 
 
 

Manufacturing companies of Italy
Truck manufacturers of Italy